Laira T&RSMD is a railway traction and rolling stock maintenance depot situated in Plymouth, Devon, England. The depot is operated by Great Western Railway and is mainly concerned with the overhaul and daily servicing of their fleet of High Speed Trains and also the DMUs used on local services.  The depot code "LA" is used to identify rolling stock based there.

After sixty years as a steam depot, servicing locomotives used on the Exeter to Plymouth line that runs past the shed as well as local lines, diesels started to arrive in 1958. A diesel depot opened in 1962 and was expanded in 1981 to accommodate the High Speed Trains.

History

Steam shed 
Laira was the location of the temporary terminus of the South Devon Railway from 5 May 1848 when a small engine shed would have been provided.  With the completion of the line to Plymouth Millbay railway station on 2 April 1849 a new shed was provided there and the facilities at Laira dismantled, although it remained a junction for the branch line to Sutton Harbour which was mixed gauge for the use of the Plymouth and Dartmoor Railway.

The Great Western Railway, which had amalgamated with the South Devon Railway on 1 February 1876, a new engine shed opened at Laira in 1901 on a site inside a triangle of lines formed by the main line, Sutton Harbour branch, and a curve that was mainly used by London and South Western Railway trains to reach their terminus at Plymouth Friary. It was adjacent to the Embankment Road with the estuary of the River Plym just the other side of the road.  The shed was a 434 by 181 feet (132 by 55-metre) brick roundhouse with a  turntable in the middle.  28 lines radiated from the turntable for stabling locomotives and it was fitted with a 20-ton hoist for lifting locomotives (a 35-ton one was added later).

A small railway station known as Laira Halt was opened on the adjacent main line on 1 June 1904 but closed again on 7 July 1930. The shed at Millbay closed in 1925 and in 1931 a new 210 by 67 feet (64 by 20-metre) four track shed at Laira was brought into use just south of the original roundhouse, funded by a government loan under the Development (Loan Guarantees and Grants) Act 1929.  This became known as the "Long Shed" or "New Shed". At the same time the coaling stage was raised and a new 50 ton hoist supplemented the smaller ones in the roundhouse.

Diesel shed

Warship Class diesel-hydraulic locomotives started to appear in 1958 and were at first accommodated in the New Shed alongside steam locomotives until the diesel maintenance depot had been finished. The Laira marshalling yard alongside Embankment Road was closed in 1958 to make room for carriage sidings and a new diesel shed, which was fully opened on 13 March 1962, although parts had been in use since 1960.

Laira was designed for the servicing and heavy maintenance of the diesel-hydraulic locomotives favoured by the Western Region of British Railways (the depot became well known as the final home of the 'Western' Class). It also handled the local diesel electric shunter and DMU fleets, although servicing of the latter was done initially at Belmont sidings at Millbay.

The diesel shed was in reinforced concrete and comprised three adjoining buildings.  The servicing and maintenance building that covers roads 1–4 is on the western side of the shed; number 1 road is equipped with a wheel lathe and lifting jacks for bogie changes.  The central building was the Heavy Maintenance Shed; engines can be removed and repainting undertaken on the two roads, numbers 5 and 6. The final three roads were in the servicing shed on the eastern side of the site, where locomotives could be inspected and refuelled. There were covered fuelling points outside in the yard, supplied by a 45,000 gallon fuel tank. A small group of buildings house stores and a workshop for shed equipment and is situated between the main shed and the curve of the Sutton Harbour branch (now realigned to the west of the shed and known locally as the "Speedway").  Carriage washing takes place south of the shed at Mount Gould, alongside the line to Plymouth Friary.

Following the withdrawal of steam from the area in 1964, the roundhouse was closed on 13 June 1965 and the area used for additional siding space.

In Edinburgh, the depot at Craigentinny was no longer able to  maintain CrossCountry's Class 43s as the space was needed by Hitachi for IETs so the 12 power cars and 5 sets of coaches were transferred to Laira. Great Western Railway started to reduce the number of its Class 43-powered services in December 2022 with the aim of withdrawing all of them by December 2023. The space freed will allow them to move the maintenance of all their Class 802s to Laira.

Historic allocation
Up to the 1960s Laira had an allocation that consisted of a wide variety of Great Western Railway motive power, including 4073 'Castle' Class and 6000 'King' Class express passenger locomotives. The following lists give summaries for various years.

During the 1960s and 1970s it was well known for its fleet of 'Western' Class diesel-hydraulics. The last of these were withdrawn in 1977, by which time British Rail Class 50 diesel-electric locomotives had taken over many of their duties. These were later given Warship names in the same manner as the first diesel hydraulics. A fleet of DMUs was also stationed here for operating the branch lines in Devon and Cornwall.

In recent years the allocation has solely consisted of Class 43 power cars for High Speed Trains along with some British Rail Class 08 shunting locomotives.  The DMUs in Devon and Cornwall were based at Cardiff Canton TMD for several years, but in December 2007 Laira had an allocation of two-car Class 150 and single-car Class 153 DMUs. After a while these were transferred to a reopened Exeter Traction Maintenance Depot.

Servicing
In addition to repairs and overhauls of the trains allocated to the Laira, the depot undertakes daily serving on other classes of train. in 2022 these are
 Allocated to Laira:
  'Castles' (3 sets, 6 power cars)
  'High Speed Trains' (2 sets, 4 power cars for CrossCountry)
 Allocated to other depots
  and  'InterCity Express Trains' (17 sets)
  DMUs (2 sets)
  and  CrossCountry 'Voyagers' (6 sets for CrossCountry)

Shed codes

The following shed codes have been used to identify locomotives allocated to Laira:

Named locomotives

Locomotives named after Laira shed have been:
 3338 (3326 from 1912) Laira GWR Bulldog Class 4-4-0 steam locomotive
 08641 Laira British Rail Class 08 0-6-0 diesel shunting locomotive
 08644 Laira Diesel Depot British Rail Class 08 0-6-0 diesel shunting locomotive
 43179 Pride of Laira British Rail Class 43 power car

References

Further reading

External links

 Encyclopedia of Plymouth History – Laira Motive Power Depot and Yard

Railway depots in England
Rail transport in Devon
Great Western Railway
Transport in Plymouth, Devon
Transport infrastructure completed in 1962